Professor Edgeworth may refer to:

 Francis Ysidro Edgeworth (1845–1926), Drummond Professor of Political Economy at Oxford University
 A fictional pseudonym of Time Lord Azmael in The Twin Dilemma, a Doctor Who story
 The Edgeworth Professor of Economics at Oxford University